Connor Grimes (born May 6, 1983 in Duncan, British Columbia) is a field hockey player from Canada.

Grimes competed at the 2008 Summer Olympics, in Beijing, as part of the Canadian team which finished the field hockey tournament in 10th place.

References

External links
 

1983 births
Living people
Sportspeople from British Columbia
Canadian expatriate sportspeople in the Netherlands
Canadian male field hockey players
Canadian people of English descent
Field hockey players at the 2006 Commonwealth Games
Field hockey players at the 2007 Pan American Games
Field hockey players at the 2008 Summer Olympics
Olympic field hockey players of Canada
People from Duncan, British Columbia
Pan American Games competitors for Canada
World Series Hockey players
Commonwealth Games competitors for Canada
Pan American Games medalists in field hockey
Pan American Games gold medalists for Canada
Medalists at the 2007 Pan American Games
2010 Men's Hockey World Cup players